RFU may refer to:

Rugby Football Union
Russian Football Union
Relative fluorescence units in DNA testing
Rosalind Franklin University

Other uses 
 Reserved for future usage (e.g. for values in protocol specifications)